Mansfield bus station serves the town of Mansfield, Nottinghamshire, England. It is located on Quaker Way. The primary bus operators are Stagecoach, with Trent Barton,  and National Express.

The bus station, built in 2013, handles around 1,500 buses and 16,000 passenger arrivals a day. It is connected via skybridge to Mansfield railway station.

Planning permission was given to develop a new bus station on the station road car park which was estimated to cost £9.
The new bus station was opened 31 March 2013
The most popular services operated by Stagecoach East Midlands are: Huthwaite, bay H. Clipstone, bay G. Walesby, bay G. pronto, bay D, L. Newark, bay K

Facilities 
The bus station has sixteen bays.

References

Transport in Nottinghamshire
Bus stations in Nottinghamshire